The Giuliano clan was a powerful Neapolitan Camorra clan that had its base in the area of Forcella, in Naples. Its sphere of influence extended to all the centre of the city of Naples for over four decades.

History
The clan was founded by Pio Vittorio Giuliano (1926 - September 27, 2009), known as ‘o padrino in the early post-war years, primarily dedicated to cigarette smuggling. He had 11 children, among them Luigi, Erminia, Guglielmo, Carmine and Raffaele Giuliano. 
Since the 1950s the organization started to accumulate a huge fortune, in fact, Pio Vittorio was considered one of the richest cigarette smugglers of Naples in the time, at its heyday the cigarette traffic alone gave to the Giuliano clan over 200 million lire a week.
In the mid-1970s Luigi Giuliano, known as 'O rre (the king), replaced his father as head of the clan, what made him the most powerful Camorra boss for the next 20 years.

The Giuliano family was widely known for their luxury lifestyle, family members were always seen in the company of influential people in trendy nightclubs. In the 1980s, photos of the former football player Diego Maradona posing with some of the sons of Pio Vittorio inside a huge shell-shaped bathtub with golden taps in one of the villas of the Giuliano family made the international newspaper headlines. In fact, Maradona was seen numerous times in the company of the Giulianos in parties, nightclubs and weddings.

War with the NCO
The Giuliano clan had been in good terms with the Nuova Camorra Organizzata, headed by Raffaele Cutolo until the first half of 1979, but the two organizations then broke out into conflict. Cutolo demanded to receive a cut from the Giuliano's illegal gambling centres and lottery system in his power base of Portici. Following this, the head of the Vollaro clan, Luigi Vollaro raised the idea of an anti-Cutolo alliance with Giuliano family. A provisional death squad was set up, which contributed to the dozens of gangland deaths that year.
The breaking point was reached when the NCO tried to expand their territories into the Giuliano's stronghold of Forcella, Piazza Mercato and Via Duomo, in the centre of Naples. The clash, which had occurred in a period of growing tension between the historic Camorra clans and the newly created NCO, led to the formation of the Nuova Famiglia, consisting particularly of the Giuliano clan, the Zaza clan, then headed by Michele Zaza, the Nuvoletta clan and the Casalesi clan, headed at the time by Antonio Bardellino. After the defeat of Cutolo, the leaders of the Nuova Famiglia achieved absolute dominance over all criminal rackets in the city of Naples. Luigi Giuliano relinquished control of the Quartieri Spagnoli to the Di Biasi brothers, who then founded the Di Biasi clan (it).

2000s
The Giuliano clan was headed by Luigi Giuliano for nearly thirty years. However, he was arrested in early 2000 and was succeeded by his sister, Erminia Giuliano Erminia became the boss because the only direct male heir to the family business still unimprisoned was deemed inept. She was ranked as one of Italy's 30 most dangerous criminals, and eventually arrested on December 23, 2000, after being a fugitive for over 10 months.

In September 2002, Luigi Giuliano decided to collaborate with the Italian authorities and became a government witness, giving another hard blow to his organization. In 2006, his son Giovanni Giuliano was killed in retaliation.

Despite the marriage, in 1996, between Marianna Giuliano, daughter of Luigi, with Michele Mazzarella, son of Vincenzo Mazzarella, one of the bosses of the Mazzarella clan, the two organizations have always been rivals, which culminated in several episodes of violence in the 2000s.

Historical leaderships 

 Pio Vittorio Giuliano, (1926 - September 27, 2009)
 Luigi Giuliano, known as 'O rre (Naples, November 3, 1949)
 Erminia Giuliano,  known as Celeste (Naples December 31, 1955)

The decline 
Following the arrests and subsequent disassociation of most of the historical leaders of the Giuliano clan in the 2000s, the Mazzarella clan, taking advantage of the power vacuum left, begin to expand their territories to the centre of the city, which, in the 2010s, leads to a war between the third generation of the Giuliano family, those left, and the Mazzarellas. The third generation of the Giulianos along with other small groups aligned to them, such as the Amirante-Brunetti-Sibillo, is dubbed by the media "Paranza dei bambini". After years at war, in 2015 the Italian justice dealt a big blow against the Paranza dei bambini, arresting virtually the entire group. By 2019, the group Giuliano-Amirante-Sibillo, known as Paranza dei bambini, due to the young age of its affiliates, is still active, but strongly weakened.

See also

 Camorra
 List of members of the Camorra
 List of Camorra clans
 Di Lauro clan
 Nuova Famiglia
 Mazzarella clan

References

 
1950s establishments in Italy
Camorra clans